Ernesto Goñi Ameijenda (born 13 January 1985) is an Uruguayan footballer who used to play as a left back for Uruguayan Primera División club Liverpool Montevideo. His nickname is "Teto", an abbreviation of his name. Now it is retired.

Club career
Goñi was born in Montevideo. A Defensor Sporting youth graduate, he made his senior debut with Racing Club de Montevideo in 2005. In August of that year, he went on a trial at Italy's Sambenedettese Calcio, but nothing came of it.

On 8 January 2010 Goñi moved to Club Nacional de Football on loan. He returned to his parent club in January 2011, and in July of that year, moved abroad after agreeing to a deal with Argentine Primera B Nacional side Quilmes Atlético Club.

After achieving promotion to Primera División during his first season and being a regular starter afterwards, Goñi moved to Estudiantes de La Plata on 8 July 2013. After being sparingly used, he rescinded his link and moved to fellow league team Club Atlético Tigre on 28 January 2015.

On 8 January 2016 Goñi signed for UD Almería in Segunda División.

Honours
Racing Montevideo
Segunda División Uruguay: 2007–08

Nacional
Copa Bimbo: 2010

References

External links

1985 births
Living people
Footballers from Montevideo
Uruguayan footballers
Association football defenders
Club Nacional de Football players
Racing Club de Montevideo players
Montevideo City Torque players
Argentine Primera División players
Quilmes Atlético Club footballers
Estudiantes de La Plata footballers
Club Atlético Tigre footballers
Racing Club de Avellaneda footballers
UD Almería players
Liverpool F.C. (Montevideo) players
Segunda División players
Uruguayan Primera División players
Uruguayan Segunda División players
Primera Nacional players
Uruguayan expatriate footballers
Uruguayan expatriate sportspeople in Argentina
Uruguayan expatriate sportspeople in Spain
Expatriate footballers in Argentina
Expatriate footballers in Spain